Loukas Spyrou (born 20 June 1973) is a Cypriot sprinter. He competed in the men's 4 × 100 metres relay at the 1996 Summer Olympics.

References

1973 births
Living people
Athletes (track and field) at the 1996 Summer Olympics
Cypriot male sprinters
Olympic athletes of Cyprus
Place of birth missing (living people)